The 2018 Longford Senior Football Championship is the 102nd running of the Longford GAA's premier club Gaelic football tournament for senior graded teams in County Longford, Ireland since the first County Championship was held in 1890 (101 completed since 1890, 1 started but not completed in 1891). The 2018 tournament consisted of 11 teams, with the winner going on to represent Longford in the Leinster Senior Club Football Championship. The championship starts with a group stage and then progresses to a knock out stage.

Mullinalaghta St Columba's retained their title in the final, defeating Abbeylara after a replay to become the first team to win three successive titles since Fr. Manning Gaels in 1998. They went on to become the first Longford club to reach the Leinster Club Senior Football final and the first Longford club to be crowned Leinster champions with victory over Kilmacud Crokes. Mullinalaghta made history by competing in the All Ireland Club Semi-Final, losing out to Dr Crokes. 

This year the number of teams was reduced to 11 after the 2017 Intermediate champions, Rathcline, opted to remain at that grade rather than be promoted. The relegation playoffs scheduled to determine which team would be regraded to Intermediate were cancelled after Ballymahon decided to withdraw and go down to Intermediate for 2019.

Team Changes

The following teams have changed division since the 2017 championship season.

From S.F.C.
Relegated to 2018 Longford Intermediate Football Championship
 St Brigid's Killashee
 Fr. Manning Gaels

Group stage
All 11 teams entered the competition at this stage. Groups A and B each consisted of 4 teams with 3 teams from each group progressing to the quarter-finals and last year's finalists being kept apart. Group C consisted of 3 teams, with 2 teams proceeding to the quarter-finals. The bottom finishers in each group were to play off to decide relegation to the 2019 I.F.C.

Group A

Round 1:
 Ballymahon 0-12, 1-9 Mostrim, 20/7/2018, 
 Abbeylara 0-17, 1-14 Clonguish, 21/7/2018,

Round 2:
 Ballymahon 0-4, 0-20 Abbeylara, 29/7/2018, 
 Clonguish 1-8, 0-6 Mostrim, 29/7/2018, 

Round 3:
 Clonguish 1-20, 1-7 Ballymahon, 18/8/2018, 
 Mostrim 1-12, 1-11 Abbeylara, 18/8/2018,

Group B

Round 1:
 Mullinalaghta St Columba's 2-17, 0-8 Colmcille, 20/7/2018, 
 St Mary's Granard 2-17, 2-6 Carrickedmond, 21/7/2018, 

Round 2:
 Colmcille 4-13, 1-11 Carrickedmond, 27/7/2018, 
 St Mary's Granard 0-11, 2-16 Mullinalaghta St Columba's, 29/7/2018, 

Round 3:
 Colmcille 1-17, 1-9 St Mary's Granard, 19/8/2018, 
 Carrickedmond 1-8, 1-21 Mullinalaghta St Columba's, 19/8/2018,

Group C

Round 1:
 Dromard 1-12, 2-9 Longford Slashers, 22/7/2018,
 Killoe Young Emmets - Bye,

Round 2:
 Longford Slashers 0-11, 0-15 Killoe Young Emmets, 28/7/2018,
 Dromard - Bye,

Round 3:
 Killoe Young Emmets 0-12, 1-10 Dromard, 19/8/2018, 
 Longford Slashers - Bye,

Knockout stage
The top 8 teams from the league stages qualify for the quarter-finals.

Quarter-finals

Semi-finals

Final

Relegation playoff

Ballymahon, Carrickedmond and Longford Slashers were scheduled to play off in a three-team group, with the bottom team being relegated to Intermediate for 2019. However, after the draw had been made, Ballymahon decided to withdraw and voluntarily regrade to Intermediate for the following season.

Leinster Senior Club Football Championship

References

Longford SFC
Longford Senior Football Championship
Longford Senior Football Championship